Western Neo-Aramaic, more commonly referred to as Siryon ( "Syrian"), is a modern Western Aramaic language. Today, it is only spoken in three villages – Maaloula, Bakhah and Jubb'adin – in the Anti-Lebanon Mountains of western Syria. Western Neo-Aramaic is believed to be the closest living language to the language of Jesus, whose first language, according to scholarly consensus, was Western Aramaic; all other remaining Neo-Aramaic languages are of the Eastern branch. It is also spoken by various communities in Lebanon.

Distribution and history
Western Neo-Aramaic is probably the last surviving remnant of a Western Middle Aramaic dialect which was spoken throughout the Orontes River Valley area and into the Anti-Lebanon Mountains in the 6th century. The continuation of this little cluster of Aramaic in a sea of Arabic is partly due to the relative isolation of the villages and their close-knit Christian and Muslim communities.

Following the Muslim conquest of the Levant, there was a linguistic shift to Arabic for local Muslims and later for remaining Christians; Arabic displaced various Aramaic languages, including Western Aramaic varieties, as the first language of the majority. Despite this, Western Aramaic appears to have survived for a relatively long time at least in some villages in mountainous areas of Lebanon and the Anti-Lebanon (in modern Syria). In fact, up until the 17th century, travellers in the Lebanon still reported on several Aramaic-speaking villages.

In the last three villages where the language still survives, the dialect of Bakh'a appears to be the most conservative. It has been less influenced by Arabic than the other dialects, and retains some vocabulary that is obsolete in other dialects. The dialect of Jubb'adin has changed the most. It is heavily influenced by Arabic, and has a more developed phonology. The dialect of Maaloula is somewhere between the two, but is closer to that of Jubb'adin. Cross-linguistic influence between Aramaic and Arabic has been mutual, as Syrian Arabic itself (and Levantine Arabic in general) retains an Aramaic substratum.

As in most of the Levant prior to the introduction of Islam in the seventh century, the villages were originally all Christian. However, Maaloula is the only village that retains a sizeable Christian population (they belong to the Greek Orthodox Church of Antioch and Melkite Greek Catholic Church) as most of the inhabitants of Bakh'a and Jubb Adin adopted Islam over the generations, and are now all Muslim. Maaloula glows in the pale blue wash with which houses are painted every year in honour of Mary, mother of Jesus.

All three remaining Western Neo-Aramaic dialects are facing critical endangerment as living languages. As with any village community in the 21st century, young residents are migrating into major cities like Damascus and Aleppo in search of better employment opportunities, thus forcing them into monolingual Arabic-speaking settings, in turn straining the opportunity to actively maintain Western Neo-Aramaic as a language of daily use. Nevertheless, the Syrian government provides support for teaching the language. Since 2007, Maaloula has been home to an Aramaic institute established by the Damascus University that teaches courses to keep the language alive. The institute's activities were suspended in 2010 amidst fears that the square Aramaic alphabet used in the program too closely resembled the square script of the Hebrew alphabet and all the signs with the square Aramaic script were taken down. The program stated that they would instead use the more distinct Syriac alphabet, although use of the Aramaic alphabet has continued to some degree. Al Jazeera Arabic also broadcast a program about Western Neo-Aramaic and the villages in which it is spoken with the square script still in use.

In December 2016 during an Aramaic Singing Festival in Maaloula, a modified version of an older style of the Aramaic alphabet closer to the Phoenician alphabet was used for Western Neo-Aramaic. This script seems to be used as a true alphabet with letters to represent both consonants and vowels instead of the traditional system of the Aramaic alphabet where it's used as an abjad. A recently published book about Maaloula Aramaic also uses this script.

The Syriac language organization Rinyo has published the Book of Psalms from the Old Testament in writing and the book Portrait of Jesus in writing with audio in Aromay in the Syriac Serto script on their website and a translation of the New Testament into Aromay has been finished in 2017 and is now available online.

In July 2017 a free course in Western Neo-Aramaic started at Damascus University.

Phonology
The phonology of Western Neo-Aramaic has developed quite differently from other Aramaic languages. However,  is the usual form for the relative particle in these two villages, with a variant , where Bakh'a always uses . Among the velar consonants, the traditional voiced pair of  has collapsed into , while /ɡ/ still remains a phoneme in some words. The unvoiced velar fricative, is retained, but its plosive complement , while also remaining a distinct phoneme, has in its traditional positions in Aramaic words started to undergo palatalization. The original uvular plosive, has also moved forward in Western Neo-Aramaic. In Bakh'a it has become a strongly post-velar plosive, and in Maaloula more lightly post-velar. In Jubb'adin, however, it has replaced the velar plosive, and become .

Consonants

Vowels 
Western Neo-Aramaic has the following set of vowels:
 Close front unrounded vowel – 
 Close-mid front unrounded vowel – 
 Open front unrounded vowel – 
 Open back rounded vowel – 
 Close back rounded vowel –

Alphabet

Square Aramaic Alphabet

Square Aramaic Alphabet used for Aromay/Western Neo-Aramaic. Words beginning with a vowel are written with an initial . Short vowels are omitted or written with diacritics, long vowels are transcribed with macrons (Āā, Ēē, Īī, Ōō, Ūū) and are written with mater lectionis ( for /o/ and /u/,  for /i/, which are also used at the end of a word if it ends with one of these vowels and if a word begins with any of these long vowels, they begin with  + the mater lectionis). Sometimes  is used both for final  and  instead of also using .

Syriac and Arabic Alphabet
Serto Syriac and Arabic alphabet used for Aromay/Western Neo-Aramaic.

Alternate Aramaic Alphabet
Characters of the script system similar to the Old Aramaic/Phoenician alphabet used occasionally for Western Neo-Aramaic with matching transliteration. The script is used as a true alphabet with distinct letters for all phonemes including vowels instead of the traditional abjad system with plosive-fricative pairs.

Sample of Lord's Prayer
Lord's Prayer in Western Neo-Aramaic, Turoyo, Syriac and Hebrew.

Miscellaneous words and sample phrases

Gallery

See also
Eugen Prym
Albert Socin
Neo-Aramaic languages
Western Aramaic languages
Syriac script#West Syriac Serṭā

Literature 
 Arnold, Werner: Das Neuwestaramäische (Western Neo-Aramaic), 5 volumes. Harrassowitz, Wiesbaden (Semitica Viva 4),
 Volume 1: Texte aus Baxʿa (Texts from Baxʿa), 1989, ISBN 3-447-02949-8,
 Volume  2: Texte aus Ğubbʿadīn (Texts from Ğubbʿadīn), 1990, ISBN 3-447-03051-8,
 Volume  3: Volkskundliche Texte aus Maʿlūla (Texts of folk tradition from Maʿlūla), 1991, ISBN 3-447-03166-2,
 Volume  4: Orale Literatur aus Maʿlūla (Oral Literature from Maʿlūla), 1991, ISBN 3-447-03173-5,
 Volume  5: Grammatik (Grammar), 1990, ISBN 3-447-03099-2/
 Arnold, Werner: Lehrbuch des Neuwestaramäischen (A Manual to Western Neo-Aramaic), Harrassowitz, Wiesbaden 1989, ISBN 3-447-02910-2.

Notes

Sources

External links
Yawna - Maaloula Aramaic a non-profit educational initiative dedicated to the preservation of Aramaic - the language of Jesus - and the rich cultural heritage of Maaloula.
 Western Neo-Aramaic alphabet and pronunciation at Omniglot
  http://semarch.uni-hd.de/dokumentgruppen.php4?ST_ID=5&DT_ID=8 .
 The dialect of Maaloula. Grammar, vocabulary and texts. (1897–1898) By Jean Parisot (in French): Parts 1, 2, 3 at the Internet Archive.

Central Semitic languages
Neo-Aramaic languages
Languages of Syria
Languages of Lebanon
Western Aramaic languages